Arthur Leyland Robinson  (1888–1959) was a physician at the Hospital for Woman at Shaw Street and the Liverpool Maternity Hospital. He later became professor of midwifery and gynaecology at the University of Liverpool. He was a foundation fellow of the Royal College of Obstetricians and Gynaecologists. He served with the Royal Army Medical Corps during the First World War.

References

1888 births
1959 deaths
Fellows of the Royal College of Obstetricians and Gynaecologists
20th-century British medical doctors
Royal Army Medical Corps officers
British Army personnel of World War I
Fellows of the Royal College of Surgeons
Academics of the University of Liverpool
British numismatists